Augustus R. Johnson Health Science and Engineering Magnet Middle and High School is a public seven-year magnet school in downtown Augusta, Georgia, United States, drawing students from grades six through twelve from all parts of Richmond County.

Academics
A. R. Johnson is accredited by the Georgia Accrediting Commission and the Southern Association of Colleges and Schools.

Aside from the standard college preparatory academic courses, Johnson offers specialized training in health sciences and engineering, and the opportunity for vocational training and dual high school/college enrollment for health science students. The school has consistently been regarded as one of the best in Georgia, regularly ranking among the top three best schools in the state.

Awards and recognition
The school received the Blue Ribbon Award in 2003 and received the 2005, 2006, and 2007 Georgia Achievement Platinum Award. In 2007 and 2009, it received a silver medal and was listed as one of the top schools in the nation by U.S. News & World Report.

History
The school opened in 1892 as Mauge Street Grammar School, taking on the name "A. R. Johnson Junior High School" in 1937. From 1945 to 1949, it served as a senior high school, and in 1956 a new building was erected to serve as the junior high school. In 1980, the school was established as an examination school. In 1980–81, A. R. Johnson Junior High School became "A. R. Johnson Health Professions High School". Under its new name, it served as a pilot program, using funds from a Magnet Implementation/Planning Grant. In 1984, feasibility studies were undertaken to introduce an engineering program at the school, which began in 1985.

On September 7, 2008, the school opened a new building that included an open-air cafeteria, an observatory deck overlooking the school's library, and its first elevator. The new building featured a dome skylight and modern layouts. The old gymnasium is currently in use as the auditorium. The expansion project was completed in 2008, and seventh and eighth graders began attending the school in August 2009. In 2015 a new wing was added for sixth graders, in August 2015 sixth graders began attending.

Background 
The school is named for Augustus Roberson Johnson (1853–1908), an African American teacher in Augusta during the late 19th century.

A. R. Johnson's mascot
The school's mascot is the panther. Male sports teams are known as the Panthers, and female teams are known as the Lady Panthers.  During the latter half of the 2008–2009 school year, a mural of the mascot was painted on the wall on the hall nearest the office at the front of the building.  It is visible from the street.

Student activities

Athletics
Johnson participates in several district competitive sports, among them track, cross country, soccer, golf, tennis, and volleyball. The school does not participate in the more traditional high school sports of football, basketball, and baseball.

Clubs

HOSA (Health Occupations Students of America)
FBLA (Future Business Leaders of America)
Literary Competition Team
Math Team
Academic Decathlon Team
Video Team
Ecology Club
TSA (Technology Student Association)
NSBE (National Society of Black Engineers)
Foreign Languages Club
Golf Team
Soccer Team
Tennis Team
Track Team
Cross Country Team
Volley Ball Team
Prom Committee
Ring Committee
Chorus
Yearbook/Journalism Staff
Student Council
Art Club
Foreign Language Club
Girl Talk
Girls who code

Alma mater

See also

Engineering

References

External links
A. R. Johnson Health Science and Engineering Magnet High School
Gravesite of Prof. Augustus Robertson Johnson

Educational institutions established in 1956
High schools in Richmond County, Georgia
Magnet schools in Richmond County, Georgia
Schools accredited by the Southern Association of Colleges and Schools
Public high schools in Georgia (U.S. state)
Public middle schools in Georgia (U.S. state)
1956 establishments in Georgia (U.S. state)